The Ikarus 256 is a high-floor bus used as a coach for long-distance service and for interurban traffic. It was made from 1977–1989, alongside the larger Ikarus 250, by the Hungarian bus manufacturer Ikarus.

Technical description 

Designed as a high-floor two-axle bus, the Ikarus 256 has a semi-self supporting body, with the engine installed under the floor at the back, following the configuration pioneered in West Germany by Setra in the 1950s and 1960s.  The body platform incorporates two airsprung beam axles, with the rear axle being a planetary axle. The axles have two hydraulic shock absorbers each. Twin tyres are fitted on the rear axle, whilst single tyres are fitted on the front axle. Their size is 10–20″. The steering system is a hydraulically assisted ball-and-nut steering system. In total, the bus has three different braking systems: A pneumatic dual-circuit braking system, an exhaust braking system and a spring-loaded parking brake.

An MAN D 2156 engine, built under licence by Rába, powers the bus. It is a straight six-cylinder, naturally aspirated, liquid-cooled, diesel engine with direct injection, displacing . The torque is transmitted to a fully synchronised five-speed gearbox via a single-disc dry-clutch; a six-plus-one-speed gearbox was also available as a factory option. With the default five-speed gearbox, the bus can reach a top speed of 106 km/h. It seats up to 45 passengers.

Bibliography 

Werner Oswald: Kraftfahrzeuge der DDR. 2nd edition. Motorbuch-Verlag, Stuttgart 2000, p. 313

External links 

Ikarus buses
Coaches (bus)
Step-entrance buses
Vehicles introduced in 1977